

Mintage numbers
The following numbers of coins were struck:

Coins of the Netherlands
Dutch